Richard Daniel Tremelling (12 November 1897 – 15 August 1970) was an English professional footballer who played as a goalkeeper. He made nearly 450 appearances in the Football League for Birmingham and Bury, including more than 300 in the First Division, and was capped for England.

Family
His brothers Sol and Billy were also footballers, as was a fourth brother, Jack. His nephew Arthur (son of Sol) was also a footballer.

Playing career
Tremelling was born in Newhall, Derbyshire. He first played for his local team, Langwith Colliery Junction Wagon Works, as a full back, but went in goal when they were hit by injuries. He played for Mansfield Town, and appeared for Lincoln City in wartime competition, but moved to Birmingham before league football resumed after the First World War. He went straight in as first choice goalkeeper, and remained so for eleven seasons, until Harry Hibbs took over in the 1929–30 season.

He played a key role in the destination of the First Division title on the final day of the 1923–24 season. His Birmingham City side faced Cardiff City who needed a win to take the title. Cardiff were awarded a penalty but Tremelling saved Len Davies' penalty kick as the match finished 0–0, ensuring that Herbert Chapman's Huddersfield Town won the title by 0.024 of a goal.

He won his only full cap for England on 28 November 1927, in a 2–1 defeat to Wales played at Turf Moor, Burnley. He moved to Bury in May 1932, but returned to Birmingham in June 1936 as assistant trainer, a position which he held for five years.

After retiring from football he went into the licensed trade, at the Old Lodge Hotel in Birmingham.

Honours
Birmingham
 Football League Second Division champions: 1920–21

References

External links
 

1897 births
1970 deaths
People from Newhall, Derbyshire
Footballers from Derbyshire
Association football goalkeepers
English footballers
England international footballers
Mansfield Town F.C. players
Lincoln City F.C. players
Birmingham City F.C. players
Bury F.C. players
English Football League players
English Football League representative players